Salt Lake High School East or simply East High School is a public high school in the Salt Lake City School District in Salt Lake City, Utah, United States. It serves grades nine through twelve in general and special education. East High School was founded in 1913 and currently has an enrolled student body of around 1,900. It is located at 840 South 1300 East in the East Bench neighborhood. The original building was completed in 1913, and the current structure was built in 1997.

Most of the Disney Channel film High School Musical was filmed at East High School. The opening scenes of its first sequel High School Musical 2 (including the film's opening number, "What Time Is It?") were also filmed at East High. Additional filming took place in St. George. The filming of the second sequel High School Musical 3: Senior Year began at East High on May 3, 2008.

History
In 1972, a fire destroyed the interior of the main building.

In 2017 the school re-purposed two locker rooms below the gymnasium and installed washing machines in order to accommodate homeless students. The non-profit organization Chapman-Richards Cares donated two washing machines and two dryers to the school. About 100 students at the time were homeless.

In July 2017, a flood caused about $3 million in damages to the school.

High School Musical
Much of the Disney Channel film High School Musical and parts of its two sequels, High School Musical 2 and High School Musical 3: Senior Year, were filmed at East High. As a result, the school has become a destination for some tourists. In the summer of 2007, the school received 40 to 50 visitors per day who wanted to visit the location of the film.

In November 2007, the school performed its own production of High School Musical. Demand for tickets was so strong that the school added an extra performance.

The school is the setting of the Disney+ show, High School Musical: The Musical: The Series.

The exterior grounds of the school were used in the 1990 film Dream Machine, starring Corey Haim.

Notable alumni
 Roseanne Barr (actress, comedian, writer, producer, director, politician) attended the school, but dropped out before graduating at 17 years old.
 Jenny Oaks Baker (class of 1993), Grammy nominated violinist
 Merrill Cook (class of 1964), U.S. Representative from Utah (1997–2001)
 Alyosha Efros, computer vision researcher and winner of the 2016 ACM Prize in Computing
 Herman Franks, Major League Baseball manager
 Patrick Fugit, actor. Star of Almost Famous.
 Jake Garn, U.S. Senator from Utah (1974–1993) and astronaut
 Greg Grant (basketball, born 1960) (class of 1979), Big West Conference Men's Basketball Player of the Year, 1985-86.
 Josh Grant (class of 1986), Professional basketball player
 Dee Hartford, actress, known as Donna Higgins during school years
 Abby Huntsman, American journalist and television personality.
 James Irwin (class of 1947), astronaut and eighth person to walk on the moon
 Bob Lewis, National champion basketball player at the University of Utah
 Jim Matheson (class of 1978), U.S. Representative from Utah (2001–2015)
 Scott M. Matheson (class of 1946), Governor of Utah (1977–1985)
 Richard Moll (class of 1960), actor
 Ritt Momney (real name Jack Rutter), indie-pop singer known for his cover of "Put Your Records On"
 Carol Ohmart, actress
 Bruce "Utah" Phillips, civil rights activist, folk singer, story teller, labor organizer, "the Golden Voice of the Great Southwest"
 Sione Po'uha (class of 1997), defensive tackle for the New York Jets
 Vernon B. Romney (class of 1941), Attorney General of Utah (1969–1977)
 Ken Sansom (class of 1944), voice actor and actor; voice of Rabbit in Disney's Winnie the Pooh
 Elizabeth Smart (class of 2006), Kidnapping survivor and activist
 Wallace Stegner (class of 1925), Pulitzer Prize-winning author
 Will Tukuafu, American football fullback
 Stevie Tu'ikolovatu (class of 2009), NFL defensive tackle for the Tampa Bay Buccaneers
 Paul Van Dam (class of 1955), Attorney General of Utah (1989–1993)
 Steven C. Wheelwright (class of 1961), Edsel Bryant Ford Professor Emeritus at Harvard Business School, former President of BYU-Hawaii
 Herb Wilkinson, led University of Utah to its only NCAA Tournament Championship in 1943–44, NCAA University of Iowa three-time All American basketball player
 Reed Jeppson, member of the school’s football team, missing since 1964

References

External links

 

Public high schools in Utah
Schools in Salt Lake City
1913 establishments in Utah
Educational institutions established in 1913